The Church of St Martin, also known as Sarum St Martin, is a Church of England parish church in Salisbury, Wiltshire. The church dates back to the 13th century and is a grade I listed building.

History
The church has a 13th-century chancel, a 14th-century tower with spire, and a 15th-century nave with aisles. From 1849 to 1850, the church building was restored by Thomas Henry Wyatt and David Brandon.

On 28 February 1952, the church was designated a grade I listed building.

Present day
The parish falls within the Traditional Anglo-Catholic tradition of the Church of England. As it rejects on theological grounds the ordination of women as priests and bishops, the parish receives alternative episcopal oversight from the Bishop of Oswestry (currently Paul Thomas).

Notable clergy

 Bruce Duncan, Principal of Sarum College, honorary curate
 Clement Ricketts, later Bishop of Dunwich, served his curacy here

References

External links
 
 

Grade I listed churches in Wiltshire
Anglo-Catholic church buildings in Wiltshire
Anglo-Catholic churches in England receiving AEO
Martin
13th-century church buildings in England